Wolfgang Öxler OSB (born 1 May 1957 in Dillingen an der Donau as Erwin Öxler) is a German Benedictine and archabbot of the St. Ottilien Archabbey.

Wolfgang Öxler studied at the professional academy for social pedagogy in Dillingen. In 1979 he joined the St. Ottilien Archabbey. He had his profession in 1983. From 1981 to 1987 he studied theology at the University of Munich. In 1988 he was ordained to the priesthood. In 2012 he was elected as archabbot of the St. Ottilien Archabbey.

References

Benedictine abbots
German abbots
Living people
1957 births